Paramecyna kaszabi is a species of beetle in the family Cerambycidae. It was described by Breuning in 1967.

References

Apomecynini
Beetles described in 1967